Lucifuga is a genus of viviparous brotulas. Most of the species are native to caves and sinkholes in Cuba and the Bahamas; L. inopinata from deep water off the Galápagos Islands is the only exception. The four species rated by the IUCN are all considered vulnerable.

Species
There are currently eight recognized species in this genus:
 Lucifuga dentata Poey, 1858 (Toothed Cuban cusk-eel)
Lucifuga gibarensis 
 Lucifuga inopinata Cohen & McCosker, 1998
 Lucifuga lucayana Møller, Schwarzhans, Iliffe & J. G. Nielsen, 2006 (Lucaya cavebrotula)
 Lucifuga simile Nalbant, 1981
 Lucifuga spelaeotes Cohen & C. R. Robins, 1970 (New Providence cusk-eel)
 Lucifuga subterranea Poey, 1858 (Cuban cusk-eel)
 Lucifuga teresinarum Díaz Pérez, 1988

References 

Bythitidae
Cave fish
Taxonomy articles created by Polbot